Delta-7-Tetrahydrocannabinol (alternatively numbered as Delta-5-Tetrahydrocannabinol, Δ5-THC, Δ7-THC) is a synthetic isomer of tetrahydrocannabinol. The (6aR,9S,10aR)-Δ7-THC epimer is only slightly less potent than Δ9-THC itself, while the (9R) enantiomer is much less potent.

See also
 7,8-Dihydrocannabinol
 Delta-3-Tetrahydrocannabinol
 Delta-4-Tetrahydrocannabinol
 Delta-8-Tetrahydrocannabinol
 Delta-10-Tetrahydrocannabinol
 Hexahydrocannabinol

References 

Benzochromenes
Cannabinoids